This is a list of films which placed number one at the weekend box office in Mexico for the year 2023.

Highest-grossing films

See also
 List of Mexican films — Mexican films by year

References

2023
Box office
Mexico